Nudaria sundamollis is a moth of the subfamily Arctiinae first described by Jeremy Daniel Holloway in 2001. It is found on Borneo and Java.

The length of the forewings is 5–6 mm.

References

Nudariina